Feruminops is a trilobite in the order Phacopida, that existed during the lower Devonian in what is now Turkey. It was described by Haas in 1968, and the type species is Feruminops crepida. The type locality was the Dede Formation.

References

External links
 Feruminops at the Paleobiology Database

Acastidae
Fossil taxa described in 1968
Devonian trilobites of Asia
Fossils of Turkey